I Am Very Macho (Spanish: Yo soy muy macho) is a 1953 Mexican comedy film directed by José Díaz Morales and starring Silvia Pinal.

Cast
 Antonio Aguilar as Tony
 Miguel Ángel Ferriz 
 Silvia Pinal as María Aguirre  
 Salvador Quiroz 
 Gina Romand as Mercedes Galán
 Fernando Soto 
 Miguel Torruco 
 Enrique Zambrano

References

Bibliography 
 María Luisa Amador. Cartelera cinematográfica, 1950-1959. UNAM, 1985.

External links 
 

1953 films
1953 comedy films
Mexican comedy films
1950s Spanish-language films
Films directed by José Díaz Morales
Mexican black-and-white films
1950s Mexican films